1088 Mitaka is a bright background asteroid from the inner regions of the asteroid belt. It was discovered on 17 November 1927, by Japanese astronomer Okuro Oikawa at the old Tokyo Astronomical Observatory in Japan. It was named after the Japanese village of Mitaka.

Orbit and classification 

Mitaka is a non-family asteroid of the main belt's background population when applying the hierarchical clustering method to its proper orbital elements. It orbits the Sun in the inner asteroid belt at a distance of 1.8–2.6 AU once every 3 years and 3 months (1,194 days). Its orbit has an eccentricity of 0.20 and an inclination of 8° with respect to the ecliptic. The body's observation arc begins at Tokyo in December 1927, one month after its official discovery observation.

Naming 

This minor planet was named after the Japanese village of Mitaka, where the discovering Tokyo Astronomical Observatory was located. Nowadays the city of Mitaka hosts the headquarters of the National Astronomical Observatory of Japan with the Tokyo Photoelectric Meridian Circle, public relation and data centers, and several telescopes. The official naming citation was mentioned in The Names of the Minor Planets by Paul Herget in 1955.

Physical characteristics 

Mitaka is a common, stony S-type asteroid in both the Tholen and Bus–Binzel SMASS classification.

Rotation period and poles 

Several rotational lightcurves of Mitaka have been obtained from photometric observations since 1989. Analysis of the best rated lightcurve by French amateur astronomer Pierre Antonini gave a rotation period of 3.0361 hours with a consolidated brightness variation of 0.23 to 0.62 magnitude.

In 2009 and 2011, modelling of Mitakas lightcurve using photometric data from the US Naval Observatory, the Uppsala Asteroid Photometric Catalogue (UAPC), the Palmer Divide Observatory's archive, the Palomar Transient Factory survey, and from individual observers, gave a concurring rotation period of 3.035377 and 3.035378 hours. The modeled lightcurves also gave a spin axis of (115.0°, 46.0°) and (278.0°, −72.0°), as well as (280.0°, −71.0°) in ecliptic coordinates (λ, β).

Diameter and albedo 

According to the surveys carried out by the Japanese Akari satellite and the NEOWISE mission of NASA's Wide-field Infrared Survey Explorer, Mitaka measures between 11.33 and 16.016 kilometers in diameter and its surface has an albedo between 0.1549 and 0.37. The Collaborative Asteroid Lightcurve Link adopts Petr Pravec's revised WISE results with an albedo of 0.1549 and takes a diameter of 16.02 kilometers based on an absolute magnitude of 11.62.

References

External links 
 Lightcurve Database Query (LCDB), at www.minorplanet.info
 Dictionary of Minor Planet Names, Google books
 Asteroids and comets rotation curves, CdR – Geneva Observatory, Raoul Behrend
 Discovery Circumstances: Numbered Minor Planets (1)-(5000) – Minor Planet Center
 
 

001088
Discoveries by Okuro Oikawa
Named minor planets
001088
001088
19271117